Colorhythm is the seventh album by Hitomi Yaida, released on 5 March 2008.

Track listing

References

2008 albums
Hitomi Yaida albums